This table shows the total population of the Municipality of Rotselaar in Belgium, as well as that of each of its constituent communes, on January 1 of each year since the merger of Rotselaar, Werchter and Wezemaal in 1977.

Population

Source: The section on demographics, on the official website of Rotselaar.

Age structure

Source: Statistics Belgium, Kerncijfers voor de gemeente Rotselaar.

Households

Footnotes

References 
 Statistics Belgium, Kerncijfers voor de gemeente Rotselaar.

See also

 Demographics of Belgium
 Rotselaar
 Werchter

Rotselaar (Demographics)
Rotselaar